Reichensperger is a German surname. Notable people with the name include:
 August Reichensperger (1808–1895), German politician
 Peter Reichensperger (1810–1892), German jurist and politician

German-language surnames